The name Linfa has been used to name four tropical cyclones in the northwestern Pacific Ocean. The name refers to the sacred lotus (Nelumbo nucifera) and was submitted by Macao.

 Severe Tropical Storm Linfa (2003) (T0304, 05W, Chedeng) – struck Japan.
 Severe Tropical Storm Linfa (2009) (T0903, 03W) – made landfall in Fujian.
 Severe Tropical Storm Linfa (2015) (T1510, 10W, Egay) – caused severe flooding throughout most of the Philippines.
 Tropical Storm Linfa (2020) (T2015, 17W) - contributed to a series of devastating floods in Vietnam, killing over 120 people.

After the 2020 storm, the name Linfa was announced to be retired and will no longer be used, It was later replaced with Peilou, which means a common migratory bird in Macao.

Pacific typhoon set index articles